The 2016 United States House of Representatives elections in Mississippi were held on November 8, 2016, to elect the four U.S. representatives from the state of Mississippi, one from each of the state's four congressional districts. The elections coincided with the 2016 U.S. presidential election, as well as other elections to the House of Representatives, elections to the United States Senate and various state and local elections. The primaries were held on March 8.

Overview

District 1

The incumbent is Republican Trent Kelly, who had represented the district since 2015. He won a special election to replace Alan Nunnelee with 70% of the vote in 2015 and the district has a PVI of R+16.

Republican primary
 Trent Kelly, incumbent U.S. Representative
 Paul Clever

Results

General election

Results

District 2

The incumbent is Democrat Bennie Thompson, who had represented the district since 1993. He won re-election with 68% of the vote in 2014 and the district has a PVI of D+13.

Republican primary

Results

General election

Results

District 3

The incumbent is Republican Gregg Harper, who had represented the district since 2009. He won re-election with 69% of the vote in 2014 and the district has a PVI of R+14.

Republican primary
 Gregg Harper, incumbent U.S. Representative
 Jimmy Giles

Results

Democratic primary
 Dennis C. Quinn
 Nathan Stewart

Results

General election

Results

District 4

The incumbent was Republican Steven Palazzo, who had represented the district since 2011. He was re-elected with 70% of the vote in 2014 and the district had a PVI of R+21.

Republican primary

Results

General election

Results

References

External links
U.S. House elections in Mississippi, 2016 at Ballotpedia
Campaign contributions at OpenSecrets

Mississippi
2016
United States House